The European Conservatives and Reformists Group Executive comprises the governing council of the major conservative grouping in the European Parliament. They are responsible for policy and internal governance decision-making, and are constituted of MEPs from every member party.

Membership
As of 12 July 2019, the Executive of the European Conservatives and Reformists had the following members:

Past leadership

Chairman
 Michal Kaminski (14 July 2009 – 8 March 2011)
 Jan Zahradil (8 March 2011 – 11 December 2011)
 Martin Callanan (11 December 2011 – 12 June 2014)
 Syed Kamall (12 June 2014 - 2019)

Election
Members of the Executive are elected on a nomination and seconding basis by free election of all member MEPs.

References

Group Executive